Chwałowice is a district of Rybnik, Silesian Voivodeship, southern Poland. On December 31, 2013 it had 7,700 inhabitants.

History 
The village was first mentioned in 1228 as Falevich, and later in the Liber fundationis episcopatus Vratislaviensis (ca. 1305) as Quelowicz.

After World War I in the Upper Silesia plebiscite 986 out of 1,593 voters in Chwałowice voted in favour of joining Poland, against 607 opting for staying in Germany. In 1922 it became a part of Silesian Voivodeship, Second Polish Republic. They were then annexed by Nazi Germany at the beginning of World War II. After the war it was restored to Poland.

In years 1945-1954 it was a seat of a gmina. On November 13, 1954 it gained the status of urban-type settlement. and on August 18, 1962 of a town. On May 27, 1975 it was amalgamated with Rybnik.

Gallery

See also 
 Chwałowice Coal Mine

References

Districts of Rybnik